Max Hartmann (7 June 1876 – 11 October 1962) was a German biologist, alluded to in the book Phylogenetic Systematics by Willi Hennig for his investigations into divisions of sciences, most notably into descriptive and explanatory. He was a philosopher of science and the author of Allgemeine Biology. 

The publicly available abstract of an article in Nature Magazine (1946) presents him as a student of the sexuality and fertilization in Protozoa and Algae; that "he can look back upon a fine record of original research... His investigations of ‘relative sexuality’ [which] have led to very important biochemical studies of the substances produced and released by gametes and essential for fertilization in Algae, echinoderms, molluscs and fishes"; and that he was an outspoken critic of Nazism. Hartmann was director of the Kaiser Wilhelm Institut für Biologie.

References 

Full text of Allgemeine Biologie at https://archive.org/stream/allgemeinebiolog00chun/allgemeinebiolog00chun_djvu.txt

20th-century German biologists
1876 births
1962 deaths
Natural philosophers
20th-century German philosophers
Academic staff of the Humboldt University of Berlin
Academic staff of the University of Tübingen
Members of the Royal Netherlands Academy of Arts and Sciences
Members of the Prussian Academy of Sciences
Members of the Bavarian Academy of Sciences
Foreign associates of the National Academy of Sciences
Recipients of the Pour le Mérite (civil class)
20th-century  German zoologists
Members of the German Academy of Sciences at Berlin
Max Planck Institute directors